Erwin Maldonado (born 25 July 1983, in San Cristóbal) is an Olympic distance freestyle swimmer from  Venezuela. He has swum for Venezuela at the:
Olympics: 2008, 2012, 2016
World Championships: 2003, 2007, 2011
Pan American Games: 2007, 2011
Central American & Caribbean Games: 2006
South American Games: 2006, 2010
Open Water Worlds: 2008

References

1983 births
Living people
Venezuelan male swimmers
Male long-distance swimmers
Olympic swimmers of Venezuela
Swimmers at the 2008 Summer Olympics
Swimmers at the 2012 Summer Olympics
Swimmers at the 2016 Summer Olympics
Swimmers at the 2011 Pan American Games
Swimmers at the 2007 Pan American Games
South American Games gold medalists for Venezuela
South American Games silver medalists for Venezuela
South American Games bronze medalists for Venezuela
South American Games medalists in swimming
Competitors at the 2006 South American Games
Pan American Games competitors for Venezuela
People from San Cristóbal, Táchira
20th-century Venezuelan people
21st-century Venezuelan people